Glatt may refer to:

Glatt group, a German manufacturer
Glatt kosher, a term used in Jewish dietary law
Glatt (Neckar), a river in Baden-Württemberg, Germany
Glatt (Rhine), a river in the Glatt Valley of the canton of Zürich, Switzerland